Hell in Catholicism is the "state of definitive self-exclusion from communion with God and the blessed" which occurs by the refusal to repent of mortal sin before one's death, since mortal sin deprives one of sanctifying grace. Like most Christian views on hell, the Catholic view is based on Sheol and Gehenna in Judaism. The church regards Sheol or Hades as the same as hell, being the place where Jesus descended to after death.

Church fathers
In Catholic theology, the writings of the church fathers are considered to be sacred tradition.

General agreement
While many church fathers taught that eternal hellfire awaits people who do not repent of sin, the history of Christian universalism includes prominent patristic theologians such as Origen and Gregory of Nyssa.

Individual opinions
Some of the fathers listed certain people who go to hell. Ignatius of Antioch said hell awaits "corruptors of families;" Clement of Rome neglectors of "his commandments;" Justin Martyr "the evildoer, the avaricious, and the treacherous;" Theophilus of Antioch "the unbelievers and...the contemptuous and..those who do not submit to the truth but assent to iniquity;" Irenaeus "those who do not believe the Word of God and despise his coming;" Hippolytus "lovers of evil;" Lactantius "unrighteous;" and Cyril of Jerusalem "a sinner" who "blaspheme...commit fornication...rob."

Ecumenical councils
The Catholic Church believes an ecumenical council, along with the pope, can under certain circumstances define doctrines infallibly.

Council of Trent
The Council of Trent taught that "those who commit infidelity,...fornicators, adulterers, effeminate, liers with mankind, thieves, covetous, drunkards, railers, extortioners, and all others who commit deadly sins" lose sanctifying grace. The council also taught that hell is eternal punishment.

Popes
According to the Catechism of the Catholic Church, Catholics owe the bishops obsequium religiosum when they speak non-infallibly.

Pius X
Pope Pius X taught that the torment of the damned consists in the deprivation of the beatific vision and various punishments, which will afflict the soul before the resurrection of the dead and afflict both body and soul after it, and which will be eternal and terrible for all the damned, but different in degree or measure based on one's sins.

John Paul II
Pope John Paul II taught that hell, which is spoken of symbolically in the Bible, does not just refer to a place, but principally refers to the state of "definitive self-exclusion from God", and that no one can know who is in hell except by special revelation.

Benedict XVI
Pope Benedict XVI's March 25, 2007 homily on hell was interpreted by some journalists as saying that hell is a place.

Catechisms
The church believes that the Roman Catechism and the Catechism of the Catholic Church authoritatively present Catholic doctrine to all Catholics.

Catechism of the Council of Trent
According to the Roman Catechism, the damned are eternally deprived of the beatific vision. They will not receive any consolations in hell, escape from the pain of hellfire, or have any company except for the demons that tempted them.

Catechism of the Catholic Church
According to the Catechism of the Catholic Church, Jesus often warned about "Gehenna" and "the unquenchable fire." The catechism goes on to say that no one is predestined to hell, since, for damnation to be even possible, "a willful turning away from God (a mortal sin) is necessary, and persistence in it until the end." The catechism further teaches that the fall of the rebellious angels from heaven is irrevocable  because they committed an unpardonable sin. The Compendium of the Catechism of the Catholic Church teaches that hell came into existence at the fall of the angels.

Church doctors
The Catholic Church believes that a doctor of the church is a saint who made significant contributions to theology.

Thomas Aquinas
In Summa Theologica, Thomas Aquinas taught that hell is reserved for the wicked and the unbaptized immediately after death, but that those who die only in original sin will not suffer in hell. Aquinas also taught that, on Judgment Day, the punishment of hell will consist of fire and of "whatever is ignoble and sordid," since "all the elements conduce to the torture of the damned," who "placed their end in material things." Aquinas further taught that the worm of the damned is a guilty conscience, that the damned will suffer over the fact of having separated themselves from God, that the damned will physically weep on Judgement Day, that hell is so full of darkness that the damned can only see things which will torment them, that the "disposition of hell" is "utmost unhappiness," that the fire of hell is non-physical (before Judgment Day) and physical (at Judgment Day), that the physical fire of hell will not be made of matter, and that whether or not hell is under the earth is unknown. Aquinas taught that the suffering of punishment is according to one's sins, so that some will suffer more, in deeper and darker pits of hell, than others.

Private revelations
In Catholic theology, a private revelation is an optional help to live more fully by divine revelation.

Our Lady of Fatima
Sister Lúcia and Francisco and Jacinta Marto claimed that Our Lady of Fatima showed them a vision of hell while declaring, "You have seen hell where the souls of poor sinners go. To save them, God wishes to establish in the world devotion to my Immaculate Heart."

Our Lady of Kibeho
Alphonsine Mumureke claimed that Our Lady of Kibeho took her to hell, which she described as a "most fearsome hot furnace where the only light was a shade of red."

Catherine of Siena
Catherine of Siena, a doctor of the church, claimed that Jesus told her that there are four main torments of hell that the other torments of hell proceed from: the loss of the beatific vision, the worm of a guilty conscience, the vision and company of Satan, and the pain of the eternal flames. She also claimed that Jesus told her that the torments of hell are suffered according to one's sins; for example, the vision of Satan is worst for doers of worst sins.

Faustina
Saint Faustina claimed to have had visited the "chasms of hell" when her guardian angel took her there, where she saw many people who disbelieved in the existence of hell. Faustina also claimed to have seen Catholic nuns in hell for breaking their vows of silence, as well as souls whom God had marked for great holiness. She further claimed that Jesus told her that, when a sinner repents of sin, Satan flies away to the bottom of hell in fear, and that, when a soul is damned, it plunges Jesus into mortal agony.

John Bosco
John Bosco claimed to have dreamed about hell. He said he was walking down a broad pleasant path that was laden with various traps - traps which prayer could prevent and the sacraments could remedy - and that the path suddenly ended in a chasm of fire, where many of the boys he taught were being tormented for their sins.

See also
 Damnation
 Jahannam 
 Problem of hell

References

Further reading

 Sermon X. On the pains of hell and Sermon L. On the eternity of hell from "Sermons for all the Sundays in the year," Dublin : Duffy (1882) by Alphonsus Liguori
 

Afterlife in Christianity
Christian terminology